Patchett is a surname. Notable people with the surname include:

Alfred Patchett Warbrick (1860–1940), New Zealand boatbuilder, rugby player and tourist guide
Ann Patchett (born 1963), American author
Arthur Patchett Martin (1851–1902), Australian writer
Dale Patchett (born 1950), American politician
George William Patchett, British motorcycle racer and engineer
Irene Amy Patchett (1887–1989) American anatomist
Jean Patchett (1926–2002), American fashion model 
John Patchett (1797–1876), the first person to plant a commercial vineyard and build a commercial wine cellar in the Napa Valley
Katrina Patchett (born  1986), professional ballroom dancer from Perth, Australia
Terry Patchett (1940–1996), politician in the United Kingdom
Wayne Patchett, Australian Paralympic athlete
William Patchett (died 1843), among the Europeans who died in the Wairau Affray

See also
Patchett gun or Sterling submachine gun, British submachine gun used in the British Army from 1944 to 1994
Patchett House, located at Ward Street (NY 17K), on the junction with Factory Street, in Montgomery, New York
Patch (disambiguation)
Patchen (disambiguation)